The 2015–16 Israel State Cup (Gvia HaMedina) was the 77th season of Israel's nationwide football cup competition and the 62nd after the Israeli Declaration of Independence.

The competition started on 4 September 2015, and the final was held on 24 May 2016.

The competition was won by Maccabi Haifa, who beat Maccabi Tel Aviv 1–0 in the final.

Preliminary rounds

First to fourth rounds
Rounds 1 to 4 double as cup competition for each division in Liga Bet and Liga Gimel. The two third-round winners from each Liga Bet division and the fourth-round winner from each Liga Gimel division advance to the sixth round.

Liga Bet

Liga Bet North A

Ironi Bnei Kabul won the district cup; Ironi Bnei Kabul and Beitar Nahariya advanced to the sixth round.

Liga Bet North B

F.C. Haifa Robi Shapira won the district cup; F.C. Haifa Robi Shapira and Hap. Ramot Menashe Megiddo advanced to the sixth round.

Liga Bet South A

F.C. Roei Heshbon Tel Aviv won the district cup; F.C. Roei Heshbon Tel Aviv and F.C. Ironi Or Yehuda advanced to the sixth round.

Liga Bet South B

Bnei Yeechalal Rehovot won the district cup; Bnei Yeechalal Rehovot and Maccabi Segev Shalom advanced to the sixth round.

Liga Gimel

Liga Gimel Upper Galilee

F.C. Hatzor HaGlilit won the district cup and advanced to the sixth round.

Liga Gimel Lower Galilee

F.C. Tzeirei Tamra won the district cup and advanced to the sixth round.

Liga Gimel Jezreel

Hapoel Bnei Ar'ara 'Ara won the district cup and advanced to the sixth round.

Liga Gimel Shomron

Hapoel Ironi Or Akiva won the district cup and advanced to the sixth round.

Liga Gimel Sharon

Hapoel Ihud Bnei Jatt won the district cup and advanced to the sixth round.

Liga Gimel Tel Aviv

Shimshon Tel Aviv won the district cup and advanced to the sixth round.

Liga Gimel Center

A.S. Nordia Jerusalem won the district cup and advanced to the sixth round.

Liga Gimel South

Maccabi Ironi Ashdod won the district cup and advanced to the sixth round.

Fifth Round
The fifth round is played within each division of Liga Alef. The winners qualify to the sixth round

Nationwide Rounds

Sixth round

Seventh round

Eighth round

Round of 16

Quarter-finals 

|}

Semi-finals

Final

References

External links
 Israel Football Association website 

Israel State Cup
State Cup
Israel State Cup seasons